Paquetá is a neighborhood, located in Paquetá Island, in the municipality of Rio de Janeiro, Brazil.

Neighbourhoods in Rio de Janeiro (city)